59th ACE Eddie Awards
February 15, 2009

Feature Film (Dramatic): 
 Slumdog Millionaire 

Feature Film (Comedy or Musical): 
 WALL-E 

The 59th American Cinema Editors Eddie Awards, which were presented on Sunday, February 15, 2009 at the Beverly Hilton Hotel, honored the best editors in films and television.

Winners and nominees

Film
Best Edited Feature Film – Dramatic:
 Chris Dickens – Slumdog Millionaire
Kirk Baxter and Angus Wall – The Curious Case of Benjamin Button
Lee Smith – The Dark Knight
Mike Hill and Dan Hanley – Frost/Nixon
Elliot Graham – Milk

Best Edited Feature Film – Comedy or Musical:
 Stephen Schaffer – WALL-E
Jon Gregory – In Bruges
Leslie Walker – Mamma Mia!
Greg Hayden – Tropic Thunder
Alisa Lepselter – Vicky Cristina Barcelona

Best Edited Documentary Film:
 Jinx Godfrey – Man on Wire
Steve Audette – Bush's War
Stuart Levy – Chicago 10

Television
Best Edited Half-Hour Series – Television:
Meg Reticker – 30 Rock for "Reunion"
Jeff Groth – Entourage for "Playing with Fire"
Dean Holland and David Rogers – The Office for "Goodbye Toby

Best Edited One-Hour Series – Commercial Television:
Craig Bench – Boston Legal for "True Love"
Lynne Willingham – Breaking Bad for "Pilot"
Karen Stern – Law & Order for "Authority"

Best Edited One-Hour Series – Non-Commercial Television:
Eric Sears – Crash for "Los Muertos"
Michael Ruscio – True Blood for "Strange Love"
Kate Sanford – The Wire for "More with Less"

Best Edited Miniseries or Film – Commercial Television:
Scott Powell – 24: Redemption
David J. Siegel – The Librarian: Curse of the Judas Chalice
Robert Florio, Mark J. Goldman, Stephen Semel, and Henk Van Eeghen – Lost: There's No Place Like Home

Best Edited Miniseries or Film – Non-Commercial Television:
Andy Keir – Bernard and Doris
Melanie Oliver – John Adams for "Independence"
Alan Baumgarten – Recount

Honorary Awards
Richard Donner – Golden Eddie Award
Sidney Katz & Arthur Schmidt – Career Achievement Award

External links
ACE Award 2009 at the Internet Movie Database

2009 film awards
2009 guild awards
59
2009 in American cinema